EaseUS Partition Master is a disk partition software that allows users to manage hard disk drives or solid-state drives on the 32-bit or 64-bit Windows PCs and Windows servers.

Overview 
Created by EaseUS Software, the program was initially released in 2006. It comes in three versions: Home, Professional, and Enterprise. It performs tasks that Windows default device manager doesn't offer, including disk surface test, hiding partitions, re-building MBR, and WinPE boot disc image.

In 2021, version 16.5 of EaseUS Partition Master added extend/shrink partition function.

See also 
 List of disk partitioning software

References 

Disk partitioning software